Franz Radakovics (1 October 1907 – 12 November 1984) was an Austrian footballer. He played in one match for the Austria national football team in 1933.

References

External links
 

1907 births
1984 deaths
Austrian footballers
Austria international footballers
Place of birth missing
Association footballers not categorized by position